In Portsmouth Football Club's Golden Jubilee season of 1948–49, the club were tipped to be the first team of the 20th century to win the Football League and FA Cup double. However, Pompey crashed out of the FA Cup in the semi-final against Leicester City, but made up for it by claiming the league title in spectacular fashion. That season also saw a record attendance of 51,385, a record which still stands to this day.

First Division

League table

FA Cup

Appearances

References
Pompey Match Results Season: 1948/49 Division One

Portsmouth F.C. seasons
Portsmouth
English football championship-winning seasons